Bouchercon is an annual convention of creators and devotees of mystery and detective fiction. It is named in honour of writer, reviewer, and editor Anthony Boucher; also the inspiration for the Anthony Awards, which have been issued at the convention since 1986. This page details Bouchercon XLII and the 26th Anthony Awards ceremony.

Bouchercon
The convention was held in the Renaissance St. Louis Grand Hotel of Saint Louis, Missouri, on September 15, 2011, and ran until September 18. The event was chaired by publisher and editors of Crimespree magazine, Jon Jordan. David Thompson, the co-owner of Houston bookstore "Murder by the Book" was also supposed to chair, however died before the event.

Special guests
Lifetime Achievement award — Sara Paretsky
American Guests of Honor — Robert Crais & Charlaine Harris
International Guests of Honor — Colin Cotterill & Val McDermid
Fan Guests of Honor — Kate Stine & Brian Skupin
Toastmaster — Ridley Pearson
Special Guests (local living legends) — Bob Randisi & John Lutz
The David Thompson Memorial Special Service award — Ali Karim

Anthony Awards
The following list details the awards distributed at the twenty-sixth annual Anthony Awards ceremony.

Novel award
Winner:
Louise Penny, Bury Your Dead

Shortlist:
Tom Franklin, Crooked Letter, Crooked Letter
Tana French, Faithful Place
Steve Hamilton, The Lock Artist
Laura Lippman, I'd Know You Anywhere

First novel award
Winner:
Hilary Davidson, Damage Done

Shortlist:
Bruce DeSilva, Rogue Island
Paul Doiron, The Poacher's Son
Graham Moore, The Sherlockian
James Thompson, Snow Angels

Paperback original award
Winner:
Duane Swierczynski, Expiration Date

Shortlist:
Robert Goddard, Long Time Coming
Bryan Gruley, The Hanging Tree
Hank Phillippi Ryan, Drive Time
Frank Tallis, Vienna Secrets

Short story award
Winner:
Dana Cameron, "Swing Shift", from Crimes By Moonlight: Mysteries from the Dark Side

Shortlist:
Doug Allyn, "The Scent of Lilacs", from Ellery Queen's Mystery Magazine September / October 2010
Chris F. Holm, "The Hitter", from Needle: A Magazine of Noir Summer
Mary Jane Maffini, "So Much in Common", from Ellery Queen's Mystery Magazine September / October 2010
Patricia L. Morin, "Homeless", from Mystery Montage: A Collection of Short Story Mystery Genres
Simon Wood, "The Frame Maker", from The Back Alley Webzine

Critical and non-fiction award
Winner:
John Curran, Agatha Christie's Secret Notebooks

Shortlist:
Rafael Alvarez, The Wire: Truth Be Told
Steven Doyle & David A. Crowder, Sherlock Holmes for Dummies
Yunte Huang, Charlie Chan: The Untold Story of the Honorable Detective and His Rendezvous with American History
David Morrell, Thrillers: 100 Must Reads

Graphic novel award
Winner:
Jason Starr, The Chill

Shortlist:
Jason Aaron, Scalped Vol 6: The Gnawing
Darwyn Cooke, Richard Stark's Parker, Vol 2: The Outfit
Joshua Hale Fialkov & Noel Tuazon, Tumor
Denise Mina, Sickness in the Family
Jill Thompson & Evan Dorkin, Beasts of Burden

Website award
Winner:
Stan Ulrich & Lucinda Surber, Stop, You're Killing Me!

Shortlist:
Jen Forbus, Jen's Book Thoughts
J. Kingston Pierce, The Rap Sheet
Chantelle Aimée Osman, Sirens of Suspense
Sandra Ruttan, Spinetingler

References

External links

Anthony Awards
42
2011 in Missouri